Events from the year 1766 in France

Incumbents
 Monarch – Louis XV

Events
On March 3, 1766, Luis XV gave a speech to the Parliament of Paris addressing his problems with the actions of the magistrates.

Art
Saint Peter Attempting to Walk on Water, oil painting by François Boucher

Births

Dates known
 July 8 - Dominique Jean Larrey, surgeon and military doctor(died 1842)
 August 6 -Charles-François Beautemps-Beaupré, hydrographic engineer and cartographer (died 1854)

Full date missing
Louis-François Bertin, journalist and publisher (died 1841)
Thomas Henry (patron of the arts), painter and patron of the arts (died 1836)
Marie-François Auguste de Caffarelli du Falga, military officer (died 1849)

Deaths

Full date missing
Jean-Marc Nattier, painter (born 1685)
Adrien Maurice de Noailles, aristocrat and soldier (born 1678)
Giovanni Niccolò Servandoni, decorator and architect (born 1695)
Thomas Arthur, comte de Lally, military officer (born 1702)

See also

References

1760s in France